Thomas P. Scott (January 7, 1920 – June 1978) was an American football coach who was co-head Coach for the Brooklyn Dodgers in 1946. He was also the assistant coach in 1947.

References

1920 births
1978 deaths